Potiaxixa intermedia is a species of beetle in the family Cerambycidae. It was described by Martins in 1979. It is known from southeastern Brazil.

References

Cerambycini
Beetles described in 1979